Kilbarchan is a village and civil parish in central Renfrewshire, in the west central Lowlands of Scotland.  The village's name means "cell (chapel) of St. Barchan". It is known for its former weaving industry.

History 

The village was once one of many weaving villages, and at one time there were 800 handlooms in the village. The weavers were active in the Radical movement which sought parliamentary reform, and Kilbarchan played a part in the agitation of the so-called Radical War of 1820. One cottage named the "Weavers Cottage" built in 1723 has been conserved by the National Trust for Scotland with weaving still in operation, and guides demonstrate handloom weaving to visitors.

Kilbarchan was the birthplace of Mary Barbour, the Scottish political activist who led the Glasgow rent strike of 1915 and later became Glasgow's first woman councillor.

Lilias Day
The main annual event in the village calendar is the celebration of Lilias Day, on the first Saturday of June, during which hundreds of visitors come to Kilbarchan to watch the parade and join in the festivities. The origins are unknown however the current run of annual celebrations started in 1968 by the Kilbarchan Primary School Parents Association. Lilias day had been previously celebrated in 1931, 1933 and 1934. There are no other records of other Lilias Days prior to that in the twentieth century.

Habbie Simpson is one of the main focuses of the celebration of Lilias day, during which he "comes to life" from his statue on the steeple, the statue being covered by a flag for the day.

Inhabitants of Kilbarchan are informally known as "Habbies" after the famous village piper Habbie Simpson.

Demographics
Kilbarchan is the home of Kilbarchan Amateur Athletics Club, and contains a Primary school, a Girl Guiding Centre, a Scout Hall, a pipe band and two churches, Kilbarchan West and Kilbarchan East which are now a united church in the former East church campus. There are two village pubs, the Trust and Habbies which was formerly known as the Glenleven. The Trust has been in establishment since 1904. It is also the village's source of live music on a Friday night.

Transport links
Kilbarchan railway station opened on 1 June 1905, and closed to passengers on 27 June 1966. It now serves as the entrance to cycle track number seven, although there are currently motions in the local transport authority to reopen the line.

Notable people
Mary Barbour, political activist, was born here
Campbell Douglas, architect, was born and raised here
Prof Thomas Gibson FRSE professor of plastic surgery and bioengineering, born here
Agnes Lyle, a ballad singer, lived here in 1825.
Hugh McIver, recipient of the Victoria Cross
John Stirling (1654–1727), Principal of Glasgow University and Moderator of the General Assembly in 1707

References

External links

Villages in Renfrewshire